The Handy Man is a 1923 American silent comedy film featuring Stan Laurel.

Cast
 Stan Laurel as The handy man
 Merta Sterling as The cook
 Otto Fries as The overseer
 Harry Mann as A mysterious stranger
 Babe London as A house guest

See also
 List of American films of 1923
 Stan Laurel filmography

External links

1923 films
1923 short films
American silent short films
American black-and-white films
1923 comedy films
Films directed by Robert P. Kerr
Silent American comedy films
American comedy short films
1920s American films
1920s English-language films